Tetraperone is a genus of flowering plants in the cosmos tribe within the daisy family.

Species
The only known species is Tetraperone bellioides, native to Cuba.

References

External links
photo of herbarium specimen at Missouri Botanical Garden, isotype of Pinillosia bellioides (basionym for Tetraperone bellioides )

Monotypic Asteraceae genera
Coreopsideae
Endemic flora of Cuba